Mike Crabtree is a British racing driver who mainly competed in touring cars. In 1969 he finished fourth overall and as champion in Class C in the British Saloon Car Championship. He drove Ford Escorts in other touring car championships in the 1970s. He also competed in endurance events, such as the Spa 24 Hours race, and the European Touring Car Championship.

Racing record

Complete British Saloon Car Championship results
(key) (Races in bold indicate pole position; races in italics indicate fastest lap.)

† Events with 2 races staged for the different classes.

^ Race with 2 heats - Aggregate result.

 Group 1 car - Not eligible for points.

References

External links
 

British Touring Car Championship drivers
Living people
Year of birth missing (living people)